The Braşov Power Station is a CHP thermal power plant located in Braşov, having 2 generation groups of 50 MW each having a total electricity generation capacity of 100 MW.

References

External links
Official site 

Natural gas-fired power stations in Romania